This was the first edition of the event.

Jimmy Connors won the title, defeating Brian Gottfried 6–2, 6–4, 6–3 in the final.

Seeds

Draw

Finals

Top half

Bottom half

References

 Main Draw

1981 Grand Prix (tennis)
Donnay Indoor Championships